Shark Tank is an American reality television series produced by Mark Burnett. 
The show features a panel of investors called "sharks," who decide whether to invest as entrepreneurs make business presentations on their company or product. The sharks often find weaknesses and faults in an entrepreneur's concept, product, or business model. Some of the investors try to soften the impact of rejection, like panel member Lori Greiner, while others such as Kevin O'Leary can be "brutal" and show "no patience even for tales of hardship." The sharks are paid as cast stars of the show, but the money they invest is their own. The entrepreneur can make a handshake deal (gentleman's agreement) on the show if a panel member is interested. However, if all of the panel members opt out, the entrepreneur leaves empty-handed. In 2015, a companion spin-off series called Beyond the Tank premiered, which follows up on some of the businesses that have appeared on the show. In this spin-off series it was revealed that sharks can still make a deal with a business that was rejected in the "tank". 

 Shark Tanks fourteenth season premiered on September 23, 2022.

Series overview

Episodes
"Yes", when displayed in the main season articles, means one or more Sharks initiated a deal; it may or may not be finalized after completing a due diligence process.

Season 1 (2009–10)

Kevin Harrington, Daymond John, Kevin O'Leary, Barbara Corcoran, and Robert Herjavec appear as the sharks in every episode this season.

Season 2 (2011)

This is Kevin Harrington's last season as a shark. Comedian Jeff Foxworthy appeared as a guest shark in two episodes this season. Mark Cuban appeared as a shark in several episodes this season; in season three he would become a regular.

Season 3 (2012)

Lori Greiner appeared as a shark in several episodes this season; in season four she would become a regular.

Season 4 (2012–13)

Season 5 (2013–14)

From this season on, as well as retroactively, Mark Cuban insisted that the production company relinquish its equity clause (two percent of their profits or five percent equity in their company) with respect to featured businesses who choose to do a deal with the sharks.John Paul Mitchell Systems co-founder John Paul DeJoria and New York Giants owner Steve Tisch appeared as guest sharks this season.

Season 6 (2014–15)

Nick Woodman, creator of the GoPro camera, appeared as a guest shark in two episodes this season.

Season 7 (2015–16)

Actor Ashton Kutcher, music manager Troy Carter, and venture investor Chris Sacca appeared as guest sharks this season.

Season 8 (2016–17)

Venture investor Chris Sacca returned as a guest shark in several episodes this season.

Season 9 (2017–18)

Guest sharks this season include Spanx founder Sara Blakely, Virgin Group founder Richard Branson, brand marketer Rohan Oza, TV personality Bethenny Frankel, and former MLB star Alex Rodriguez.

The series moved to Sunday nights for this season. After the cancellation of Ten Days in the Valley, and with the March arrival of ABC's reboot of American Idol, the majority of episodes aired back-to-back in two-hour blocks.

Season 10 (2018–19)

Guest sharks for this season, subtitled "A Decade of Dreams," include Jamie Siminoff, the first guest shark to have sought a deal on the show (the sharks passed on his company Doorbot, now known as Ring).

Season 11 (2019–20)

Guest sharks this season include Katrina Lake, founder and CEO of Stitch Fix; Daniel Lubetzky, founder and CEO of Kind; tennis player Maria Sharapova; and Anne Wojcicki, CEO and co-founder of 23andMe. Recurring Sharks include Rohan Oza and Matt Higgins.

Season 12 (2020–21)

Guest sharks this season include Blake Mycoskie, founder of TOMS and co-founder of Madefor, and Kendra Scott, founder and CEO of Kendra Scott LLC. Returning guest Sharks include Alex Rodriguez, baseball player and founder and CEO of A-Rod Corp, and Daniel Lubetzky, founder and executive chairman of Kind.

Season 13 (2021–22)

Guest sharks this season include Emma Grede, CEO and co-founder of Good American and founding partner of Skims; actor and comedian Kevin Hart; Peter Jones, dragon on Dragons' Den; Daniel Lubetzky, founder and executive chairman of Kind; and Nirav Tolia, co-founder of Nextdoor.

Season 14 (2022–23)

Guest sharks this season include Emma Grede, CEO and co-founder of Good American and founding partner of Skims; Gwyneth Paltrow, actress and founder of goop; Peter Jones, dragon on Dragons' Den; Daniel Lubetzky, founder and executive chairman of Kind; Kendra Scott, founder and CEO of Kendra Scott LLC; and Tony Xu, CEO and co-founder of DoorDash.

References

Shark Tank episodes
Shark Tank episodes
Shark Tank episodes
Shark Tank
Episodes